Ai Ueda (born 26 October 1983 in Kyoto) is a Japanese triathlete. She is the winner of the 2005 and 2008 Asian Triathlon Championship and the winner of the 2013 ITU Duathlon World Championships. She has represented Japan in triathlon in both the 2008 and 2012 Summer Olympics.

Career
Ai Ueda moved to Chiba after finishing high school to dedicate herself completely to triathlon. In the same year she won the Junior Asian Championships and in 2003 she became an Elite triathlete.

In the 2008 Summer Olympics, Ai Ueda took 17th in women's triathlon. In the 2012 Summer Olympics she placed 39th.

ITU competitions 
In the nine years from 2002 to 2010, Ueda took part in 88 ITU competitions and achieved 29 top ten positions, among which 12 gold medals.
In the World Championship Rankings 2010 Ai Ueda is number 31 of the world's best female elite triathletes. Unless indicated otherwise, all competitions are triathlons (Olympic distance) and belong to the "Elite" category.

DNF = Did not finish

References

External links
 
 
 

1983 births
Japanese female triathletes
Living people
Olympic triathletes of Japan
Sportspeople from Kyoto
Triathletes at the 2008 Summer Olympics
Triathletes at the 2012 Summer Olympics
Triathletes at the 2016 Summer Olympics
Asian Games medalists in triathlon
Triathletes at the 2006 Asian Games
Triathletes at the 2014 Asian Games
Medalists at the 2014 Asian Games
Duathletes
Asian Games gold medalists for Japan
Asian Games silver medalists for Japan
World Games gold medalists
World Games silver medalists
Competitors at the 2013 World Games
Competitors at the 2022 World Games
20th-century Japanese women
21st-century Japanese women